Mario Recordón Burnier nicknamed The Tiger of Osorno (14 July 1922 – 5 June 1994) was a Chilean architect, athlete and educator. He led Chile to victory in the decathlon in the 1946 South American Athletics Championships and competed in the men's 110 metres hurdles at the 1948 Summer Olympics.

Early life and education
He was the son of Swiss immigrants Julio Recordon Borel and Rosa Burnie Bruchez. He studied at the Osorno Lyceum and the National Boarding School at Barros Arana. Relocating to Santiago in 1939, he studied in the Faculty of Architecture and Urbanism at the University of Chile, receiving a degree in architecture in 1946.

Athletic career
A self-taught athlete, he first competed in 1942, after reading in a newspaper about the possibility of competing in an interfaculty tournament at Los Leones stadium. His first major competition was a university tournament in which he came in first place in the shot put event.

In 1945, he placed in the XIV South American Athletic Championships in Montevideo. Competing for the first time in the decathlon, he won, surprising all the participants not only with his victory but with his physical appearance, tall and blonde, a contrast to the rest of the Chilean delegation.

In the 1946 South American Championships, which took place in Chile, he set records in the 110 meter hurdles and the 1500 meters. He also took part in the decathlon, and on the first day came in first in four of the five events and second in the other. On the second day, however, it turned out that he had pulled a muscle, an injury that prevented him from breaking the world record of 7,000 points, but he came close with 6,886 points. This represented an improvement of 500 points over his performance in the same combined event in Montevideo. His achievement at the 1946 championships brought Chile the gold, consigning Argentina and Brazil to second and third place, respectively.

He took part in the Olympic Games in London in 1948, although little by little his performance declined, until a strong bout of typhus obliged him to bow out of the final competition. Competing later at the local level, he combined this activity with his career as an architect.

Athletic honors
2 Gold medals at the 1946 South American Championships in Chile in the decathlon and the 110-meter hurdle.  
South American record-holder in the 110-metre hurdle and decathlon.

Architectural career
From the time he received his degree in 1946, he pursued his career as an architect while continuing to participate in sports. In 1955 he was named professor of Architectural Composition at the University of Chile. In 1964 he was given the Chair of Architectural Design at the same institution.

Between 1988 and 1990 he was Dean of the Faculty of Architecture and Urbanism at the University of Chile.

Professional honors
In 1987 he was awarded the National Prize in Architecture.

Death
He died of a heart attack at Lake Colico on June 5, 1994.

Personal life
In 1952 he married Marianne Martin Guilleux, with whom he had three children: Felipe, Catalina, and  Nicolás.

Architectural accomplishments
Estadio Cubierto Metropolitano (actual Movistar Arena)
Estadio Monumental
Estadio Regional de Antofagasta
Hipódromo de Antofagasta
Estadio El Cobre
Cine de Coronel
Estadio Israelita
Casino de Puerto Varas
Estadio Municipal de Concepción
Estadio de Valdivia
Gimnasio Municipal de Valdivia

Recognition
The running track at the National Stadium bears his name.
The Olympic Village at Osorno is also named for him..
The University of Chile established the Marío Recordón Medal, which is awarded in recognition of academic achievement.
The Mario Recordón Athletic Competition is organized by the Universitarios Azules in Santiago.
The Mario Recordón Student Athletic Competition is an annual event in Osorno.

References

1922 births
1994 deaths
University of Chile alumni
Chilean male shot putters
Chilean educators
People from Osorno, Chile
20th-century Chilean architects
Athletes (track and field) at the 1948 Summer Olympics
Olympic athletes of Chile
Chilean male hurdlers